Vincas Ramutis Gudaitis (born December 8, 1941) is a Lithuanian politician.  In 1990 he was among those who signed the Act of the Re-Establishment of the State of Lithuania.

References
Biography

1941 births
Living people
Members of the Seimas
Place of birth missing (living people)
Signatories of the Act of the Re-Establishment of the State of Lithuania
20th-century Lithuanian politicians